Delminichthys ghetaldii is a species of ray-finned fish in the family Cyprinidae.

It is found in Bosnia and Herzegovina, with its natural habitats being rivers, freshwater springs, and inland karsts.
It is threatened by habitat loss. The name is in honor of ragusan mayor and horticulturalist Francesco Ghetaldi-Gondola (1833-1899), who apparently facilitated the collection of type from a cave in Herzegovina in 1882.

Sources

 

Delminichthys
Cyprinid fish of Europe
Fish described in 1882
Taxonomy articles created by Polbot
Freshwater fish of Europe
Endemic fish of the Neretva basin
Endemic fauna of Bosnia and Herzegovina